is a manga by Osamu Tezuka that began serialization in 1967.

Plot
In this children's manga, Punch and his sister Pinko are approached by a strange man calling himself the God of Gum.  Looking like a kind of eccentric scientist, he explains that the gum he has is special as it will allow the gum chewer to create whatever they want with the bubbles they blow.  However, since Punch and Pinko are still young, they have not mastered the ability to blow bubbles.

Seeing as this might be a problem, and to prevent the children from potentially misusing the gum, the God of Gum assigns his disciple, Gum Gum, to stay with the children.  Together, the three explore the many possible uses of the magical chewing gum and get into mischief.

Characters
Punch: A young boy who, along with his sister, is given magical chewing gum.  When chewed, the bubble that is blown can take the shape of just about anything the chewer desires.
Pinko: Punch's younger sister who can also use the magic chewing gum.
Gum Gum: A disciple of the God of Gum who is assigned to make sure the children don't abuse the gum's powers and to help teach them how to blow bubbles properly.  Punch often picks on him because he is so short.
Kucha Kucha:  Another disciple of the God of Gum, but is far larger than Gum Gum.  He joins Gum Gum in looking after the kids when Gum Gum needs an extra hand.
God of Gum: A strange man who looks like a kind of scientist who is a master of chewing gum.  He gives the children magical chewing gum, and assigned
Mama: Punch and Pinko's mother.

See also
List of Osamu Tezuka anime
List of Osamu Tezuka manga
Osamu Tezuka
Osamu Tezuka's Star System

References

The character Monkey D. Luffy (One Piece) ate a devil's fruit called the Gomu Gomu No Mi (lit. Gum Gum fruit). This may have been influenced by Osamu Tezuka's manga, Gum Gum Punch.

External links
"Gum Gum Punch" manga page at TezukaOsamu@World 
"Gum Gum Punch" manga page at TezukaOsamu@World 
"Gum Gum Punch" manga publications page at TezukaOsamu@World 
"Gum Gum Punch" manga publications page at TezukaOsamu@World 
"Gum Gum Punch" pilot anime page at TezukaOsamu@World 
"Gum Gum Punch" pilot anime page at TezukaOsamu@World 

Osamu Tezuka manga
1967 manga
Shogakukan manga